Counties 1 Western West (known as Counties 1 Tribute Western West for sponsorship reasons) is an English rugby union league. Originally a single division called Western Counties, in 1996 the division split into two regional leagues called Western Counties North and Western Counties West. Western Counties West was renamed Counties 1 Western West prior to the 2022–23 season and is currently a seventh tier league for clubs based in the south-west of England; mainly Cornwall, Devon and Somerset. The champions are promoted to Regional 2 South West. The number of teams relegated depends on feedback following promotion and relegation in the leagues above, but is usually two or three to either Counties 2 Cornwall, Counties 2 Devon or Counties 2 Somerset, depending on location.

Format
The champions are promoted to Regional 2 South West (formerly South West 1 West), while the last two teams, depending on their location, are relegated to Counties 2 Cornwall, Counties 2 Devon or Counties 2 Somerset. In previous seasons teams were relegated to the Cornwall/Devon league. The season runs from September to April and comprises twenty-two rounds of matches, with each club playing each of its rivals, home and away. The results of the matches contribute points to the league as follows:
 4 points are awarded for a win
 2 points are awarded for a draw
 0 points are awarded for a loss, however
 1 losing (bonus) point is awarded to a team that loses a match by 7 points or fewer
 1 additional (bonus) point is awarded to a team scoring 4 tries or more in a match.

Current season

Participating teams and location

2021–22

Participating teams and location

League table

2020–21
Due to the coronavirus pandemic the season was cancelled.

2019–20

Participating teams and location

League table

2018–19

Participating teams and location

League table

Promotion play-off
In the play-off for promotion, Crediton played Midsomer Norton from Western Counties North for promotion to South West 1 West. Midsomer Norton had the best playing record and hosted the match, losing 15 – 19. This was the first time either team had participated in the play-offs, at this level, and Crediton's win was the sixth time the away team had won match. Teams from Western Counties North lead 10–9 in the nineteen play-off matches played since 2001.

2017–18

Participating teams and location
The 2017–18 Western Counties West League consists of fourteen teams; seven from Devon, five from Cornwall and two from Somerset. The season started on 2 September 2017 and finished  on 21 April 2018. Ten of the fourteen teams participated in last season's competition. The 2016–17 champions, Exeter University were promoted to South West 1 West, along with the play-off winners Cullompton, while Chard (12th place) and Kingsbridge (13th) were relegated from that league. Bude and Wellington were relegated to the Cornwall/Devon League and were replaced by Falmouth (champions) and Paignton (runner-up).

League table

Promotion play-off
Each season, the runners-up in Western Counties West and Western Counties North, participate in a play-off for promotion to South West 1 West. The team with the best playing record, in this case Chew Valley, host the match, and for the second successive season they lost, this time to Devonport Services 12 – 22. It is the first time Devonport Services are promoted to a level six league. This match was the eighteenth play-off for promotion; the northern sides lead with ten victories to the west's eight and the home teams are leading thirteen to five.

2016–17

Participating teams and location
The 2016–17 Western Counties West League consists of fourteen teams; seven from Devon, five from Cornwall and two from Somerset. The season began on 3 September 2016 and finished on 22 April 2017. Ten of the fourteen teams participated in last season's competition, the 2015–16 champions, Okehampton were promoted to South West 1 West, along with the play-off winners Kingsbridge. Two Cornish teams, Penryn and Saltash were relegated to the Cornwall/Devon League and were replaced by Bude (champions) and St Ives (runner-up). The three relegated teams from South West One were all allocated places in Western Counties North so the two most westerly teams from that division, Burnham and Wellington were transferred to this league to bring the number of teams to fourteen.

League table

Promotion play-off
Each season, the runners-up in Western Counties West and Western Counties North, participate in a play-off for promotion to South West 1 West. The team with the best playing record, in this case Chew Valley, host the match and they lost to Cullompton 12 – 29.

2015–16
The 2015–16 Western Counties West League consists of fourteen teams; nine from Devon and five from Cornwall. The seasons started on 5 September 2015 and the last matches were played on 30 April 2016.

Participating teams and location
Ten of the fourteen teams participated in last season's competition. The 2014–15 champions Teignmouth were promoted to South West 1 West and Tavistock and St Ives were relegated to the Cornwall/Devon League. The only team from Somerset, Wellington, was transferred to Western Counties North.

League table

Promotion play-off
Each season, the runners-up in Western Counties North and Western Counties West, participate in a play-off for promotion to South West 1 West. The team with the best playing record, in this case Kingsbridge, hosted the match against Keynsham and won 16 – 10.

2014–15

Participating teams and location
The 2014–15 Western Counties West consisted of fourteen teams; nine from Devon, four from Cornwall and one from Somerset. The season started on 6 September 2014 and finished on 18 April 2015. Teignmouth became champions with two matches to play after Exeter University had fifty points deducted for playing ineligible players. Teignmouth were promoted to South West 1 West, while the second place team, Kingsbridge, lost to the runner-up of Western Counties North, Newent in the play-off for promotion. The last two teams, Tavistock and St Ives were relegated to Cornwall/Devon.

League table

Promotion play-off
Each season, the runners-up in Western Counties North and Western Counties West, participate in a play-off for promotion to South West 1 West. The team with the best playing record, in this case Newent, hosted the match; their opponents were Kingsbridge who lost the match 26 – 28 to a stoppage time penalty.

2013–14
Bude
Burnham-on-Sea
Devonport Services
Ivybridge
Kingsbridge
Okehampton
Paignton Saxons
Penryn
St Ives
Tavistock
Teignmouth
Torquay Athletic
Truro
Wellington

2009–10
Bude
Camborne
Devonport Services
Kingsbridge
Minehead Barbarians
Newquay Hornets
North Petherton
Okehampton
Penryn
Tavistock
Tiverton
Truro
Wadebridge Camels
Withycombe

2007–08

Original teams
When league rugby began in 1987 this division (known as Western Counties) contained the following teams:

Avon & Somerset Police
Cirencester
Clevedon
Gordon League
Matson
Newquay Hornets
Okehampton
Old Redcliffians
Sidmouth
Tiverton
Truro

Western Counties honours
In the first season of the English rugby union league pyramid, sponsored by Courage, there was ten, tier seven leagues. The Western Counties League was for teams based in the south-west of England from Bristol, Cornwall, Devon, Gloucester and Somerset. Each team played one match against each of the other teams with the winning team awarded two points, and there was one point for each team in a drawn match. This system prevailed for five seasons, and in 1992–93 the number of teams increased from eleven to thirteen. The following season Western Counties League was renamed Courage South West 2 League, and three seasons later in 1996–97 a major reorganisation occurred with South West 2 being split into two regional leagues: 
 Courage Western Counties North consisted of sixteen teams based in Bristol, Gloucestershire and Somerset, and each team continued to play the others once
 Courage Western Counties West consisted of eleven teams based in Cornwall, Devon and Somerset, and each team played the other twice.

Western Counties (1987–1993)
Originally Western Counties North and Western Counties West was a single division called Western Counties (sponsored by Courage), involving teams based in the south-west of England including Bristol, Cornwall, Devon, Gloucester and Somerset. Each team played one match against each of the other teams with the winning team awarded two points, and there was one point for each team in a drawn match.  It was a tier 7 league with promotion up to South West 2 and relegation to either Cornwall/Devon or Gloucestershire/Somerset.

Western Counties (1993–1996)
At the end of the 1992–93 season the top six teams from London Division 1 and the top six from South West Division 1 were combined to create National 5 South. This meant that Western Counties dropped from a tier 7 league to a tier 8 league for the years that National 5 South was active. Promotion continued to South West 2 and relegation down to either Cornwall/Devon or Gloucestershire/Somerset. The league continued to be sponsored by Courage.

Western Counties West (1996–2009)
Major restructuring by the RFU at the end of the 1995–96 season saw Western Counties split into two separate leagues, Western Counties North and Western Counties West, which reverted to tier 7 leagues due to the cancellation of National 5 South. Promotion from Western Counties West was now to the new South West 2 West division (formerly South West 2) while relegation was now to Cornwall/Devon. From the 2008–09 season the league sponsor is Tribute.

Western Counties West (2009–present)
Despite widespread league restructuring by the RFU, Western Counties West continued as a tier 7 league, with promotion to South West 1 West (formerly South West 2 West) and relegation to Cornwall/Devon. Tribute continued to sponsor the league.

Promotion play-offs
Since the 2000–01 season there has been a play-off between the runners-up of Western Counties North and Western Counties West for the third and final promotion place to South West 1 West. The team with the superior league record has home advantage in the tie. As of the end of the 2019–20 season the northern sides have been the more successful with ten victories to the west's nine while the home team has won thirteen times compared to the away teams six.

Number of league titles

Penryn (3)
Camborne (2)
Ivybridge (2)
Okehampton (2)
St Austell (2)
Barnstaple (1)
Clevedon (1)
Coombe Down (1)
Crediton (1)
Cullompton (1)
Dings Crusaders (1)
Exeter University (1)
Exmouth (1)
Gloucester Old Boys (1)
Gordon League (1)
Launceston (1)
Matson (1)
Mounts Bay (1)
North Petherton (1)
Old Patesians (1)
Paignton (1)
Sidmouth (1)
St Ives (1)
Teignmouth (1)
Torquay Athletic (1)
Truro (1)
Wadebridge Camels (1)
Wellington (1)

Summary of tier seven format since 1987

Sponsorship
The Western Counties League was part of the Courage Clubs Championship and was sponsored by Courage Brewery from the first season, 1987–88 to season 1996–97. The league was unsponsored until season 2007–08 when St Austell Brewery sponsored South-west based leagues under the Tribute Ale label.

Notes

See also
 South West Division RFU
 Cornwall RFU
 Devon RFU
 Somerset RFU
 English rugby union system

References

External links
 Tribute Western Counties West

Recurring sporting events established in 1987
7
1
Rugby union in Devon
Rugby union in Somerset
Sports leagues established in 1987